Samphon Mao (born 9 December 1949) is a Cambodian sprinter. He competed in the men's 100 metres at the 1972 Summer Olympics.

References

External links
 

1949 births
Living people
Athletes (track and field) at the 1972 Summer Olympics
Cambodian male sprinters
Olympic athletes of Cambodia
Place of birth missing (living people)
Southeast Asian Games medalists in athletics
Southeast Asian Games bronze medalists for Cambodia
Competitors at the 1973 Southeast Asian Peninsular Games